Westfalenhallen station is an underground rapid transit station in the city of Dortmund, in North Rhine-Westphalia, Germany. It is part of the Dortmund Stadtbahn network and serves the Westfalenhallen venues.

Services
, the following services stop at Westfalenhallen:

 : service every 10 minutes to Dortmund Hauptbahnhof.

References

External links
 

Dortmund VRR stations